Gold River is a village municipality located close to the geographic centre of Vancouver Island in British Columbia, Canada. In terms of the Island's human geography it is considered to be part of the "North Island", even though it technically is on the Island's west coast.

History

Taking advantage of its deep water and abundant forests, Gold River developed in 1967 as a prototypical logging and pulp and paper industry community. Gold River quickly sprang into prosperity and established excellent community facilities. When shifting world markets brought the mill closure in 1998, many of Gold River's inhabitants were forced to relocate. Since then, the village has attempted to capitalize on its idealistic setting among picturesque mountains, lakes, rivers, ocean, and forests to develop tourism and sport fishing as its main economic supports.

Currently, Gold River serves as a base for such famous activities as the Nootka Island trek, hiking the Elk Lake trail and mountain climbing Golden Hinde (Vancouver Island's highest peak), Crest Creek climbing crags, MV Uchuck III, and the Great Walk.

Gold River also serves as a historic point, being the closest village to the famous Yuquot, or "Friendly Cove", where British explorer Captain James Cook first set ashore. There Cook met the Mowachaht native band's chief, Chief Maquinna.

Demographics 

Luna, the orca
In 2001, a two-year-old male orca, later named Luna, was seen in Nootka Sound alone as far inland as the marina at Gold River. Presumed to be an orphan separated from his pod, Luna became a local and international celebrity by his playful and curious behavior with lumber tugboats and recreational watercraft on Nootka Sound, and with people, including young children, on the Gold River dock. The popularity of Luna made Gold River an international attraction from early 2002 through March 2006 when Luna was killed in an accidental collision with a tugboat propeller.

Climate
Gold River has a Marine west coast climate (Köppen climate classification Cfb). With warm dry summers and mild rainy winters, during the winter constant Low Pressure Systems moving off of the Pacific Ocean causes winter to be the wettest season. Most precipitation falls as rain year round but snow is not uncommon in the winter months averaging  but does not usually stay long. This is due to the community being located inland surrounded by mountains, causing Adiabatic heating to occur giving Gold River its own microclimate. The average rainfall all year is  making the west coast of Vancouver Island the wettest place in Canada.

The record high recorded for the village was  recorded on July 28, 2009. That record high, however, was shattered during the 2021 Western North America heat wave. The record low was  recorded on January 28, 1980.

References

External links

Villages in British Columbia
Northern Vancouver Island
Populated places in the Strathcona Regional District
Nootka Sound region
Logging communities in Canada